The Edinburgh Filmhouse was a cinema located in Edinburgh, Scotland, which opened in 1979. It was home to the world's oldest continually running film festival, Edinburgh International Film Festival. The cinema closed in October 2022 when its parent body went into administration.

History
The building that housed the Filmhouse was  erected in 1831 as United Presbyterian Church (later United Free Church), designed by the architect David Bryce in a Neoclassical villa style. It later became St. Thomas's Church of Scotland.

The cinema began life when, in 1979, the disused St. Thomas Church building was converted into a 100-seat auditorium (later cinema 2) accessed via a side entrance on Morrison Street Lane. The front of the building was listed and remained inaccessible until in 1985 when a new 280 seat auditorium and bar were added and the front entrance opened. It was located on Lothian Road nearby the Usher Hall, Traverse and Lyceum Theatres.

In March 2020, it was announced that the Filmhouse had plans to build a new home for the cinema on Festival Square, next to its existing premises. This was a revival of a plan that failed to win backing in 2004. The new cinema was never built, likely due to the company’s subsequent financial troubles.

Starting in 2001, Edinburgh Filmhouse hosted the Edinburgh Greek Festival.

Running
Filmhouse was a trading name of Centre for the Moving Image (CMI), a registered charity which also incorporated the Edinburgh International Film Festival, Edinburgh Film Guild and Belmont Filmhouse, Aberdeen.

Since its inception it hosted the Edinburgh International Film Festival annually.

The Filmhouse was a publicly funded arthouse cinema. Its programme was varied, ranging from art-house and foreign cinema to mainstream and second run films seven days a week.

The building included a cafe and bar.

On 6 October 2022 the CMI went into administration and closed its operations including the Filmhouse while seeking buyers for its assets.

References

Cinemas in Edinburgh
Former churches in Scotland